Whitfield is an unincorporated community in Perry Township, Martin County, in the U.S. state of Indiana.

History
Whitfield was originally known as Stremler, and under the latter name was founded in 1892. A post office was established at Whitfield in 1892, and remained in operation until it was discontinued in 1906.

Geography

References

Unincorporated communities in Martin County, Indiana
Unincorporated communities in Indiana